Vanderford Glacier is a glacier about 8 km (5 mi) wide flowing northwest into the southeast side of Vincennes Bay, slightly south of the Windmill Islands. It was named by the Advisory Committee on Antarctic Names (US-ACAN) for Benjamin Vanderford, pilot of the sloop of war Vincennes of the United States Exploring Expedition under Captain Wilkes, 1838–42. The glacier was mapped from aerial photographs taken by U.S. Navy Operation Highjump, 1946–47.

See also
 List of glaciers in the Antarctic
 Glaciology
 Vanderford Valley

References
 

Glaciers of Wilkes Land